The highest-selling albums and EPs in the United States are ranked in the Billboard 200, published by Billboard magazine. The data are compiled by Nielsen Soundscan based on each album's weekly physical and digital sales. In 2007, there were 37 albums that reached peak position, in 52 issues of the magazine.

Noël, a Christmas album by American singer-songwriter Josh Groban, was the longest-running album of 2007, topping the chart for four consecutive weeks in December. Its four-week consecutive run gained Noël the credit as the first Christmas album to have achieved the feat in the chart's 51-year history. Following Groban's appearance at The Oprah Winfrey Show, sales of the album logged at 405,000, fueling the album to peak at number one and becoming Groban's best sales week ever. Noël is the only Christmas-themed record to have topped the Billboard 200 since American saxophonist Kenny G's 1994 Miracles: The Holiday Album. Noël had accumulated sales of nearly 2.8 million copies by the end of the year, becoming the best-selling album of 2007.

Canadian singer Avril Lavigne scored her second number-one album The Best Damn Thing.
High School Musical 2, the soundtrack to the Disney Channel film of the same name, spent four straight weeks at the top spot. The soundtrack's first-week sale of 615,000 copies made it one of the albums with biggest debut figures of 2007. The soundtrack sold over 2.7 million units in 2008, becoming the second-best-selling album. High School Musical 2 is one of the two soundtrack albums to have reached number one on the chart, the other being Dreamgirls: Music from the Motion Picture. Linkin Park's Minutes To Midnight becomes the band's third number-one album. The album sells over 620,000 copies in its first week, becoming the third highest first week album sales for 2007. The album eventually sells over 2 million copies during the year, becoming the seventh best-selling album of the year. American singer Alicia Keys' As I Am also topped the chart for four weeks, although they were non-consecutive. It debuted on the Billboard 200 for selling 742,000 copies, the highest figure achieved for a solo female artist since Norah Jones' Feels Like Home moved one million copies in 2004.

Rapper Kanye West's Graduation took the distinction as the album with the highest sales in a week, netting over 957,000 units. It is the best sales week by any album since rapper 50 Cent's The Massacre opened with over 1.1 million copies in March 2005. Rock band The Eagles landed atop the chart with Long Road out of Eden, which sold 711,000 copies, the band's first studio album in 30 years. Sold through retailers Wal-Mart, Sam's Club and the band's web site, it marked the first time Billboard magazine allowed exclusive albums to appear on the Billboard 200. Rapper Jay-Z produced his 10th number-one album, American Gangster, placing him second, tying with Elvis Presley, in the acts with the most number-one albums in the history of Billboard 200, only behind band The Beatles who had 19.

Chart history

See also
 2007 in music
 List of Billboard 200 number-one albums

References

2007
United States Albums